Itaguaru is a municipality in central Goiás state, Brazil.

Location
The distance to the regional center of (Anápolis) is 127 km.
Highway connections are made by GO-070 / Goianira / Inhumas / Itauçu / GO-154 / Taquaral de Goiás / Itaguari. For a complete list of distances in the state of Goiás see Seplan

Neighboring municipalities are Jaraguá, Itaguari, Itaberaí and Uruana

Demographics
Demographic Density: 22.79 inhabitants/km2 (2007)
Number of voters:  4,924 (December/2007)
Population growth rate:   0.12% 1996/2007
Total population (2007): 5,467
Total population (1980): 7,130
Urban population (2007): 4,288
Rural population (2007): 1,179

The economy
The economy is based on services, small industries, cattle raising (32,000 head in 2004), and modest agriculture.
Number of industrial establishments: 15
Number of retail establishments: 50
Banking establishments: Banco do Brasil S.A. (August/2007)
Dairies: Divino Cézar Ribeiro e Cia Ltda. (22/05/2006)
Number of automobiles:  582

Agricultural data 2006
Farms:  489
Total area:  12,133 ha.
Area of permanent crops: 3,530 ha. (bananas with 1,100 ha. hearts of palm, and coffee)
Area of perennial crops: 431 ha.
Area of natural pasture:  7,323 ha.
Area of woodland and forests:  652 ha.
Persons dependent on farming:  1,200
Farms with tractors: 25
Number of tractors:  34
Cattle herd:  32,000 head IBGE

Health and education
Hospitals: 2 (2007)
Hospital beds: 40
Health clinics (Sistema Único de Saúde): 1
Schools: 5 (2006)
Classrooms: 34
Teachers: 80
Number of students: 1,540
Infant mortality rate: 26.30
Literacy rate: 86.0

Itaguaru had a ranking of 0.746 (2000) on the Municipal Human Development Index, giving it a state ranking of 90 (out of 242 municipalities)
and a national ranking of 1,997 (out of 5,505 municipalities).  For the complete list see frigoletto.com.br

See also
 List of municipalities in Goiás
Microregions of Goiás

References

Frigoletto

Municipalities in Goiás